The years leading up to World War II (and during the conflict) saw great changes in the sexual habits of European societies.

France

In the occupation years, as the French dealt with their humiliating defeat and surrender, the morality of sex in the Vichy occupation changed.  In his book 1940–1945, The Erotic Years: Vichy, or, the Misfortunes of Virtue, Patrick Buisson talks about "erotic shock ... or exploring new territories of pleasure." After the occupation he writes about French prisoners bedding local German girls, while back in their homeland French women had intimate relations with their German occupiers.  Local cinemas and even subway stations became locations for anonymous physical trysts during Allied bombings.  After Allied liberation, anyone who had a reputation for associating with the Germans were targeted as collaborators, and faced hazing or worse.

Germany
Within Germany in the 1930s, many German Protestants and Catholics shared the view that Jewish people were responsible for the sexual immorality that pervaded Weimar Culture. Many church leaders supported the Nazis, welcoming radical measures against "public immorality" that included shutting down brothels, gay and lesbian bars, and nudist organizations.  The initial support of the leadership of both the Catholic and Protestant churches was based on the belief that the Nazis would purify German sexual mores and reinstitute respect for family values.

In the early 1900s, Germany, and particularly Berlin, developed a reputation for relaxed sexual mores; as Dagmar Herzog writes in Sexuality In Europe: A Twentieth Century History, "There was more detailed discussion of the best techniques for enhancing female orgasm under Nazism than there would be in the far more conservative decade of the 1950s."  The flipside to liberalization for some was crackdowns on others.  By the 1930s, Nazi leadership was increasingly anxious about being perceived as "queer".  In 1934, Hitler facilitated the murder of a friend and leader of the paramilitary wing of the Nazi Party, an openly gay man, Ernst Röhm. Until that time, many bars frequented by members of the Sturmabteilung were well known as gay bars, and there was no perceived tension between activism espousing greater rights for homosexuals and right-wing politics.  The prevalence of same-sex institutions like Hitler Youth and the League of German Girls fostered suspicions of homoeroticism, and subsequently the regime tried to prove its straightness. All of that would change, however, when the virulently homophobic Heinrich Himmler became one of the most powerful people in the Reich.  In 1935, Nazis strengthened laws on the books that criminalized male (but not female) homosexuality. Not only mutual masturbation but parallel individual masturbation and even "erotic" glances fell under the purview of the law. Penalties for homosexual behavior escalated considerably by 1937. By the end of the war, approximately 100,000 men had been prosecuted for same-sex behavior. Close to half had been convicted, sent to labor camps, prisons, or penitentiaries, subjected to medical experiments, or forced to have sex with female prostitutes.  Many Jewish people who were held captive would realize a similar fate.  

The association between sex, homosexuality, and Jewish people was supported by Catholic and Protestant church leaders and ultimately the Nazi regime.  While not all activists who fought for the legalization of abortion and homosexuality were Jewish, many were, and their leadership in these movements made them easy targets of religious vitriol. Nazism exploited this anger. Sexual innuendo was a vital component of Nazi anti-Semitism, exploiting sentiment that readily associated Jewish people with sex.  

The reorganization of sexuality was at the heart of the Nazi project. It would be a mischaracterization, however, to declare that the Third Reich was repressive for everyone. For those who did not fall prey to its animus, the Nazi regime's overall goal was not to suppress sexuality, but to foster it as a distinctly Aryan privilege. While structural racism of any kind has always necessarily depended on controlling reproduction, this was especially true of the Third Reich. Restrictions on contraception and abortion coaxed the reproduction of those deemed "healthy" to further the Volk, or race, who were ushered along through financial incentives and propagandistic enticements, while those deemed unfit to reproduce were prohibited from doing so with sterilization, involuntary abortion, and mass murder. By the early 1940s, it was no secret that the regime was openly encouraging extramarital sex and marital infidelity, endorsing it not only as a reproductive measure, but also as a pursuit of pleasure reserved exclusively for the racially pure. Abortions were denied to the majority of German women, while coercive abortions were violently imposed on Roma and Jewish women. Nazi sexual politics harnessed two competing tendencies, playing into either when politically expedient: conservative currents of consternation and concern with sex on the one hand, and the greater historical trend of liberalization of heterosexual norms on the other, in order to execute a viciously homophobic and racist agenda.   

The German birth rate, like that in most industrial nations, had been falling for decades.  When Hitler and the Nazi Party took power in 1933 they implemented several revolutionary policies in order to change the sexual practices of the German people and reverse this slide in birth rates.  At the same time that it forbade the mixing of Jews and Germans through the Nuremberg Laws, the Nazi government tried a number of policies designed to increase new births.  One action was to change the marriage laws via the 1938 divorce-reform law by the Minister of Justice, Franz Gürtner.  Within two years 30,000 divorces were filed, 80% of which were husbands casting off women over 45 years old.  While the divorce law increased new marriages and children from these marriages, the Nazis looked to illegitimate births in Germany as a way to increase Germany's birthrate.

In the 1920s, there were about 150,000 illegitimate births in Germany, before halving during the depression and bouncing up to 100,000 in 1935.  The Nazis wanted to increase the illegitimate births by encouraging out of wedlock births, especially those of Aryan heritage.  Part official policy, part propaganda, the Nazi policy manifested itself in the Lebensborn program.  The Lebensborn program provided a place where pregnant mothers could have their babies out of wedlock in secret.

Only the most "pure" of its applicants were chosen to join its programs.  Of all the women who applied, only 40 percent passed the racial purity test (they had to show their family tree three generations back) and were granted admission to the Lebensborn program. The majority of mothers were unmarried, 57.6 percent until 1939, and about 70 percent by 1940.

The Lebensborn program was given a further push when Himmler issued a proclamation that every SS soldier should father a child before he left for war.  The child could then be born and raised at the Lebensborn facilities.  Through these policies the birth rate increased and Himmler told his doctor Kerstern how proud he was to have a role in the change, "Only a few years ago illegitimate children were considered a shameful matter ... [now] my men tell me with shining eyes that a son has been born to them.  Their girls consider it an honour, not a source of shame."

Once World War II broke out and men were sent to the front, the Nazis changed their promise of "every woman will have a man" to "every woman will have a child".  A report to the Ministry of Justice in 1944 stated that:

Leaders of the [League of German Girls have] intimated to their girls that they should bear illegitimate children; these leaders have pointed out that in view of the prevailing shortage of men, not every girl could expect to get a husband in future, and that the girls should at least fulfill their task as German women and donate a child to the Führer.

As a mark of how much sexual attitudes had changed by the end of the war, 23% of all young Germans were infected with a venereal disease, and prostitution had quadrupled, including male and female prostitution, as the Allies were many times more willing to have sexual relations with a male (who could not get pregnant).  A number of scandals, including males caught naked/sexually involved with other males, caused some of the male prostitutes to be shipped to smaller towns or islands, where they were the majority of men there and they caused many families to break up, given their proclivity to maintain a strong homosexual identity through relationships with males they had found in smaller towns.  Often, this proclivity developed as the consequence of rape by Allied soldiers or the harsh living conditions which drove huge numbers of starving Germans into prostitution just to survive.

Had the Germans triumphed, Himmler and Bormann were considering a post-war institution of double marriage for Nazi party officials and war heroes.

Bibliography
Notes

References

 - Chapter page length: 17

1930s in Europe
1930s in LGBT history
1940s in Europe
1940s in LGBT history
Abortion in Europe
History of human sexuality
Politics of Nazi Germany
Sexuality in Europe
Social history of Europe